Mirbelia baueri is a species of flowering plant in the family Fabaceae and is endemic to New South Wales. It is an erect or prostrate shrub with sharply-pointed linear leaves and orange and purple flowers.

Description
The flowers are arranged singly in leaf axils, each flower on a  short pedicel.

Taxonomy
This pea was first formally described in 1837 by George Bentham, who gave it the name Chorizema baueri in Commentationes de Leguminosarum Generibus, based on specimens collected by Ferdinand Bauer. In 1958, Joy Thompson changed the name to Mirbelia baueri in the Proceedings of the Linnean Society of New South Wales.

In 1938, William Blakely described Mirbelia jeanae and wrote "Named in honour of Miss Jean Buckingham, junior member of the Australian Naturalists' Society of New South Wales, who discovered this very pretty species on a rocky sandstone plateau in Gold Gully, 2 miles south-east of Penrose railway station, October 2, 1938". Ronald Melville advised Joy Thompson that M. jeanae "appeared to be synonymous with M. baueri, and it is listed as such by the Australian Plant Census.

Distribution and habitat
Mirbelia baueri grows at higher altitude in exposed heathlands in rocky areas on sandy soils. It mainly occurs from the Blue Mountains to Nerriga, but is also found on the South and Central coasts.

References

Mirbelioids
baueri
Fabales of Australia
Flora of New South Wales
Taxa named by George Bentham
Plants described in 1937